The 2012 Montana State Bobcats football team represented Montana State University as a member of the Big Sky Conference during the 2012 NCAA Division I FCS football season. The Bobcats were led by sixth-year head coach Rob Ash and played their home games at Bobcat Stadium. They finished the season 11–2 overall and 7–1 in Big Sky play to share the conference championship with Cal Poly and Eastern Washington. The received an at–large bid into the FCS playoffs where they defeated Stony Brook in the second round before falling to Sam Houston State in the quarterfinals. It was the second straight year the Bobcats were knocked out of the playoffs by Sam Houston State.

Schedule

Game summaries

Chadron State

@ Drake

Stephen F. Austin

Northern Colorado

@ Southern Utah

@ UC Davis

Eastern Washington

North Dakota

@ Sacramento State

Portland State

@ Montana

FCS Playoffs

Stony Brook–FCS Playoffs Second Round

Sam Houston State–FCS Playoffs Quarterfinals

This is the second straight year the Bobcats and Bearkats have met in the FCS quarterfinals. Last years game was in Huntsville, Texas.

Ranking movements

References

Montana State
Montana State Bobcats football seasons
Big Sky Conference football champion seasons
Montana State
Montana State Bobcats football